Florenceville may refer to:

Florenceville, New Brunswick, Canada
Florenceville Airport
Florenceville Bridge
Florenceville, Iowa, United States